Lakmal Fernando (born 5 December 1980) is a Sri Lankan cricketer. He played seventeen first-class and twelve List A matches for multiple domestic sides in Sri Lanka between 200 and 2004. His last first-class match was for Moors Sports Club in the 2003–04 Premier Trophy on 13 February 2004.

See also
 List of Chilaw Marians Cricket Club players

References

External links
 

1980 births
Living people
Sri Lankan cricketers
Bloomfield Cricket and Athletic Club cricketers
Chilaw Marians Cricket Club cricketers
Moors Sports Club cricketers
Place of birth missing (living people)